St Andrew's is an electoral ward in the London Borough of Havering. The ward has existed since the creation of the borough on 1 April 1965 and was first used in the 1964 elections. It returns three councillors to Havering London Borough Council.

Summary
Councillors elected by party at each general borough election.

1965–1978
St Andrew's ward has existed since the creation of the London Borough of Havering on 1 April 1965. For elections to Westminster it was part of the Hornchurch constituency and for elections to the Greater London Council it was part of the Havering electoral area from 1965 and then the Hornchurch electoral area from 1973.

1964 election
It was first used in the 1964 election to Havering London Borough Council, with an electorate of 8,695 returning three councillors. On 7 May 1964 election there was a turnout of 47.2%. The councillors did not formally take up office until 1 April 1965, for a three-year term.

1968 election
At the 9 May 1968 election the electorate was 8,479 and three Conservative Party councillors were elected. Turnout was 45.1%. The councillors were elected for a three-year term.

1968 by-election
On 27 June 1968 there was a by-election. Turnout was 27.7%.

1971 election
For the 13 May 1971 election the electorate was 9,441 and there was a turnout of 42.7%. Three Conservative Party members were elected. The councillors were elected for a three-year term.

1974 election
For the 2 May 1974 election the electorate was 9,436 and there was a turnout of 42.5%. Three Conservative Party members were elected. The councillors were elected for a four-year term at this and subsequent elections.

1978–2002
There was a revision of ward boundaries in Havering in 1978.

From 1979 the ward was part of the London East constituency for elections to the European Parliament and from 1999 to 2020 the London constituency.

1978 election
For the election on 4 May 1978 the electorate was 9,027 and turnout was 44%. Three Conservative Party members were elected.

2002–2022
There was a revision of ward boundaries in Havering in 2002. The St Andrew's ward occupies a triangle of land between the Romford to Upminster Line in the north to the District line in the south, and from the River Ingrebourne in the east to Harrow Lodge Park in the west. It includes central Hornchurch and parts of the Elm Park and Upminster Bridge areas. Since 6 May 2010 the ward has formed part of the Hornchurch and Upminster UK Parliament constituency.

2002 election
For the election on 2 May 2002 the turnout was 38.3%. As an experiment, it was a postal voting election, with the option to hand the papers in on election day. Three Hornchurch Residents Association members were elected.

2006 election
For the election on 4 May 2006 the turnout was 40.8%. Two Hornchurch Residents Association members and one Conservative Party member were elected.

2007 by-election
A by-election took place on 14 June 2007, caused by the resignation of Brenda J. Riddle of the Hornchurch Residents Association. Mike Winter of the Hornchurch Residents Association was elected.

2009 by-election
A by-election took place on 4 June 2009 caused by the resignation of David G. Charles of the Conservative Party. John C. Wood of the Hornchurch Residents Association was elected.

2010 election
For the election on 6 May 2010, which took place on the same day as the United Kingdom general election, the turnout was 68.8%. Two Hornchurch Residents Association members and one Conservative Party member were elected.

From 2022
There was a revision of ward boundaries in Havering in 2022.

References

Wards of the London Borough of Havering
1965 establishments in England